This is the List of municipalities in Rize Province, Turkey .

References 

Geography of Rize Province
Rize